This is a list of lists of places considered the most extreme by virtue of meeting some superlative geographical or physical criterion – e.g. farthest, highest, lowest, greatest, or least.

Earth
 Extremes on Earth
 List of countries by northernmost point
 List of countries by southernmost point
 List of countries by easternmost point
 List of countries by westernmost point
 Northernmost settlements
 Southernmost settlements
 List of northernmost items
 List of southernmost items
 List of countries by highest point
 List of countries by lowest point
 List of elevation extremes by country
 List of elevation extremes by region
 List of highest towns by country

Continents
 Extreme points of Afro-Eurasia
 Extreme points of Africa
 Extreme points of Eurasia
 Extreme points of Europe
 Extreme points of Asia
 Extreme points of the Americas
 Extreme points of North America
 Extreme points of the Caribbean
 Extreme points of Central America
 Extreme points of South America
 Extreme points of Antarctica
 Extreme points of Oceania
 Extreme points of Australia
 Extreme points of the Antarctic
 Extreme points of the Arctic

Sovereign states

Dependencies, autonomies, and other territories
 Extreme points of the Faroe Islands
 Extreme points of Greenland
 Extreme points of Guam
 Extreme points of Niue
 Extreme points of Northern Cyprus
 Extreme points of the Northern Mariana Islands
 Extreme points of Taiwan
 Extreme points of Western Sahara

Miscellaneous political subdivisions
 Extreme points of the Commonwealth of Nations
 Extreme points of the African Union
 Extreme points of the British Isles
 Extreme points of Canadian provinces
 Extreme communities of Canada
 Extreme points of the European Union
 Extreme points of New England
 Extreme points of U.S. states

Space
 List of Solar System extremes
 List of extrasolar planet extremes
 List of hottest stars
 List of largest cosmic structures
 List of largest stars
 List of most massive black holes
 List of most massive stars
 List of most luminous stars

See also
 World record